This list of flight distance records contains only those set without any mid-air refueling.

Non-commercial powered aircraft

Commercial aircraft

Shortest distance
The Loganair Westray to Papa Westray route and its return flight make up the shortest flight distance for any scheduled air carrier service. The route is 2.8 km (1.7 miles), and travel time, including taxi, is usually less than two minutes. The route is served by Loganair airlines' Britten-Norman Islander aircraft. This record was established when service began in 1967, and it remains in effect as of December 2022.

Other types of aircraft

See also
 Flight length
 Flight endurance record
 Cross-America flight air speed record
 Aerial circumnavigation
 Longest flights

Notes and references

References
 Green, William, Gordon Swanborough and Pierre Layvastre. "The Saga of the Ubiquitous Breguet". Air Enthusiast, Seven, July–September 1978. pp. 161–181.
 Mikesh, Robert C. and Abe, Shorzoe. Japanese Aircraft 1910-1941. London:Putnam, 1990. .
 Taylor, John W. R. Jane's All The World's Aircraft 1966-67. London:Sampson Low, Marston & Company, 1966.

Aviation records
World records